Essey may refer to:
Essey, Côte-d'Or, a commune in Côte-d'Or, France
Yessey, a rural settlement in Krasnoyarsk Krai

See also
essay, piece of writing